Huejúcar   is a town and municipality, in Jalisco in central-western Mexico. The municipality covers an area of 550.23 km2.

As of 2010, the municipality had a total population of 6,084.

The name Huejúcar means "Place of Willows" in Nahuatl. It is about 240 km from the state capital, Guadalajara. It is next to Santa María de los Ángeles and Tepetongo. The municipality borders with the state of Zacatecas.

The city of Huejucar can trace its history back beyond the creation of Nueva Galicia in the Viceroyalty of New Spain. In 1530, Pedro Almíndez Chirinos passed through and conquered the area in the name of Spain during his voyage from Cuitzeo, Michoacan to Tepic, Nayarit.  On March 13, 1837, a decree is made that Huejucar would become part of the Colotlan Municipality. Later, on November 9, 1861, Huejucar would become its own municipality and twelve years later on September 24, 1873, would receive the title of Villa.

Summer months can reach highs on average of 38.3C (100.9F) while winter months reach lows on average of 0.8C (33.4F). Due to the Sierra Madre Occidental Mountains to the west, winds usually gust from the northeast. Hydrothermal streams and ponds dot the landscape to the west while the east and northeastern areas lead into the vast Mexican Plateau region in between the Sierra Madre Occidental and Oriental regions.

Mexican Federal Highway 23 runs north–south which connects Huejucar on the southern terminus to the metropolitan area of Guadalajara, Jalisco and on its northern terminus to Fresnillo, Zacatecas.

Flora and fauna 
Its vegetation is scarce in most of the territory. There are mainly drought-resistant plants such as: Vachellia farnesiana, Mesquite, Pitaya, Opuntia ficus-indica, Agave and some species of Populus, Pine and other trees in a small proportion.

Government

Municipal presidents

References

External links
 

Municipalities of Jalisco